Stan Pelecky is a former member of the Wisconsin State Assembly.

Biography
Pelecky was born on April 27, 1934 in Milwaukee, Wisconsin. After graduating from Washington High School, Pelecky attended the University of Wisconsin–Madison and Marquette University. He would also serve in the United States Army with the Signal Corps and the 32nd Infantry Division and as counsel during special courts-martial. He died on March 24, 1997.

Political career
Pelecky was elected to the Assembly in 1962. Previously, he was an unsuccessful candidate for the Assembly in 1960 and for the Wisconsin State Senate in 1958. He was defeated in the Democratic primary for his seat by Mark Lipscomb Jr. in 1964.

References

1934 births
1997 deaths
Politicians from Milwaukee
Democratic Party members of the Wisconsin State Assembly
Military personnel from Milwaukee
United States Army Judge Advocate General's Corps
Wisconsin lawyers
University of Wisconsin–Madison alumni
Marquette University alumni
20th-century American politicians
20th-century American lawyers